The 1933 season was the Chicago Bears' 14th in the National Football League and the 11th season under head coach  George Halas. The team was able to improve on their 7–1–6 record from 1932 and finished with a 10–2–1 record. 

The Bears won their first six games while allowing only 33 points. In the middle of the season, the team struggled on the road, losing to Boston and New York and eking out a tie against the new Philadelphia Eagles franchise. After that, however, the Bears regained their winning ways, finishing the regular season with four consecutive wins, including two against Portsmouth, their foe in the indoor 1932 playoff game. The team won the newly established Western Division by 3½ games, and hosted and won the first ever NFL championship game.

Season highlights
The Bears' season was typified by solid defense, a high-octane passing attack (for the era), and the best kicking game in the league. Only three times during the season did opponents score more than 9 points on the Bears. The club finished second behind Brooklyn in scoring defense. Their line was greatly improved by the addition of huge George "Moose" Musso, who weighted over 260 pounds and starred for the Bears for many years. The Bears had the third best scoring offense, trailing the explosive Giants and the Packers. Living legend Red Grange and future legend Bronko Nagurski continued to lead the running attack but the Bears scored a large majority of their touchdowns through the air. Luke Johnsos continued to play well at end but the aerial attack was vastly improved by the emergence of second year end Bill Hewitt and rookie end Bill Karr. All in all, the Bears scored 11 of their 14 offensive touchdowns through passes. Though statistics were spotty in 1933, Bill Hewitt was among the league leaders in receiving with 16 catches for 274 yards and 2 touchdowns. The biggest improvement for the Bears and, in many games, the key to their wins was the addition of "Automatic" Jack Manders, one of the first great place kickers in league history. Manders made 14 of 14 PATs (pretty much unheard of in those days) and led the league with 6 field goals. Undoubtedly, the new rule that brought the ball back to the hash marks after every play helped Manders (and all other NFL kickers), but Manders' consistency in the kicking game contributed to the Bears' success all the way through the 1940 season.

Regular season

Schedule

Standings

NFL Championship Game

Summary
The Bears hosted the NFL Eastern Division champion New York Giants in the NFL championship game. The teams had split the season series, with both teams prevailing at home. The game was played at Wrigley Field in clear, crisp weather. Both teams brought high-powered offenses to the game but the Bears had an advantage on defense. Both teams featured their passing attacks throughout the game but the Giants took a first half lead with a 29-yard pass to Red Badgro despite two Manders field goals. The second half was back and forth, with both clubs taking the lead twice. The game was won with an exciting play with less than 3 minutes remaining—a pass from Bronko Nagurski to Bill Hewitt who lateraled to Bill Karr. Karr then scampered 36 yards for the winning score. The Bears won the game 23–21, giving them their second straight league title and third overall.

Box score

Player stats

Future Hall of Fame players
Red Grange, back
Bill Hewitt, end
Link Lyman, tackle
George Musso, tackle (rookie from Millikin)
Bronko Nagurski, fullback
George Trafton, center

Other leading players
Carl Brumbaugh, quarterback
Luke Johnsos, end
Bill Karr, end (rookie from West Virginia University)
Joe Kopcha, guard
Jack Manders, back/kicker (rookie from University of Minnesota)
Keith Molesworth, back
Gene Ronzani, back (rookie from Marquette)

Chicago Bears
Chicago Bears seasons
National Football League championship seasons
Chicago Bears